Cambarus catagius, the Greensboro burrowing crayfish, is a species of crayfish in the family Cambaridae. It is found only in a limited area of North Carolina, where it is considered a species of special conservation concern.

References

Further reading

 
 
 

Cambaridae
Articles created by Qbugbot
Crustaceans described in 1967
Taxa named by Horton H. Hobbs Jr.
Freshwater crustaceans of North America
Endemic fauna of North Carolina